Pain Ahmad Kola (also Romanized as Pā’īn Aḩmad Kolā) is a village in Saheli Rural District, in the Central District of Babolsar County, Mazandaran Province, Iran. At the 2006 census, its population was 1,158, in 285 families.

References 

Populated places in Babolsar County